The Crow's Nest is a 1922 American silent Western film directed by Paul Hurst and starring Jack Hoxie, Rudd Weatherwax and Evelyn Nelson.

Cast
 Jack Hoxie as Esteban
 Rudd Weatherwax as Esteban, as a boy 
 Evelyn Nelson as Patricia Benton
 Thomas G. Lingham as Beaugard
 William Berke as Pecos 
 William Dyer as Timberline
 Mary Bruce as Margarita
 Bert Lindley as John Benton
 Augustina López as The Squaw

References

External links
 

1922 films
1922 Western (genre) films
American black-and-white films
Films directed by Paul Hurst
Silent American Western (genre) films
1920s English-language films
1920s American films